Gabriel Ștefan Șerban (born 11 February 2000) is a Romanian professional footballer who plays as a midfielder for Liga I club FC Hermannstadt.

Honours
Astra Giurgiu
Cupa României runner-up: 2020–21

References

External links
 
 
 

2000 births
Living people
Sportspeople from Ploiești
Romanian footballers
Association football midfielders
Liga I players
Liga II players
Liga III players
FC Astra Giurgiu players
FC Hermannstadt players
FC Metaloglobus București players